St Francis is an undated and unfinished oil on canvas painting attributed to Bernardo Strozzi. It is housed in the parish church in Campagnola Cremasca.

It has similarities to other paintings of Francis of Assisi by Strozzi now held in Genoa (Palazzo Bianco, Palazzo Rosso and Rubinacci collection) and the Pinacoteca di Siena. Its attribution to Strozzi originated with Cesare Alpini, but the artist's uncertain chronology means it is impossible to date it more precisely than his mature post-Mannerist period.

References

Paintings by Bernardo Strozzi
Strozzi
Paintings in the Province of Cremona
17th-century paintings
Unfinished paintings